Lantan is a commune in the Cher department in the Centre-Val de Loire region of France.

Geography
The river Airain forms most of the commune’s northern and eastern boundaries.

Population

Sights
 The church of St. Paul, dating from the thirteenth century.
 The nineteenth-century chateau of Singleton.

See also
Communes of the Cher department

References

Communes of Cher (department)